The  1995 Campeonato Argentino de Rugby was won by selection of Cordoba that beat in the final the selection of Tucumàn
The 20 teams (but only 18 played) were divided on 3 levels : "Campeonato", "Ascenso", "Clasificacion".
Due to the incoming reduction to 6 teams in the higher level, the winner of the two pools of di "Ascenso" played a play-out for admission per to "Campeonato" against the third of the higher levels.

Rugby union in Argentina in 1995

National 
 The "Campeonato Argentino Menores de 21" (Under 21 championship) was won by Tucumàn
 The "National Championship for clubs" was won by Club Atlético San Isidro that beating in the final La Plata 
 The "Torneo de la URBA" (Buenos Aires) was won by La Plata
 The "Cordoba Province Championship" was won by Tala
 The North-East Championship was won by  Nat. y Gimnasia and Tucumán RC

International 
 In order to prepare the 1995 Rugby World Cup, the Pumas went to Australia, were lost heavily both test match

 At the World Cup Argentina lost all the matches against England, Samoa and Italy.
 As usual, Argentina won the 1995 South American Rugby Championship
 Argentina won also the first edition of Pan American Championship

"Campeonato" 
The 8 teams were divided in two pools

Play Out 

The winner of this play out between the third of each pool of "Campeonato" and the winner of "Ascenso" will be admitted to the 1996 "Campeonato"

 San Juan and Cuyo admitted to 1996 "Campeonato"
 Entre Rios and Santa Fè relegated

"Ascenso"

"Clasificacion"

External links 
 Memorias de la UAR 1995
  Francesco Volpe, Paolo Pacitti (Author), Rugby 2000, GTE Gruppo Editorale (1999)

Campeonato Argentino de Rugby
Argentina
Campeonato